The yellow-bearded greenbul (Criniger olivaceus) is a species of songbird in the bulbul family, Pycnonotidae. It is found in western Africa.

Taxonomy and systematics
Alternatively, the yellow-bearded greenbul has been classified in the genus Xenocichla (a synonym for Bleda) and has also been considered as conspecific with the white-bearded greenbul. Alternate names for the yellow-bearded greenbul include the olive bulbul, olive greenbul, olive-bearded bulbul, yellow-bearded bulbul, yellow-throated olive bulbul and yellow-throated olive greenbul. The name 'olive bulbul' should not to be confused with the species of the same name, Iole virescens.

Distribution and habitat
It is found in West Africa from eastern Sierra Leone to south-western Ghana.  Its natural habitat is subtropical or tropical moist lowland forests.  It is threatened by habitat loss.

References

yellow-bearded greenbul
Birds of West Africa
yellow-bearded greenbul
Taxonomy articles created by Polbot